Summer Ade is the fourth extended play by South Korean girl group DIA. It was released digitally on August 9, 2018, by MBK Entertainment under Interpark's music distribution. The EP includes a total of eight tracks including the lead single "WooWoo".

It is the only release with an eight-member group without Eunjin who departed from the group in May 2018, and last release feature of member Jenny who cite their promotions due to the health and knee injury and subsequent departure from the group.

Release
DIA released on their fourth album Summer Ade on August 9, 2018, with the title track "Woo Woo". The EP was released through several music portals, including MelOn in South Korea, and iTunes for the global market.

Promotion
On August 14, the group received their first music show win on SBS MTV's The Show.

Commercial performance 
The album debuted and peaked at number 5 on the Gaon Album Chart for the week ending August 25, 2018. In its second week the album fell to number 52 and rose to number 25 in its third week. The album charted for five consecutive weeks within the Top 100.

The album placed at number 23 for the month of August 2018 with 9,889 copies sold. It has sold 12,076 copies as of September 2018.

Track listing

Charts

Release history

Awards and nominations

Music program wins

References

2018 EPs
DIA (group) albums
Interpark Music EPs
Korean-language EPs